
Gmina Lgota Wielka is a rural gmina (administrative district) in Radomsko County, Łódź Voivodeship, in central Poland.

Villages
Gmina Lgota Wielka contains the villages and settlements of Brudzice, Długie, Kolonia Lgota, Krępa, Krzywanice, Lgota Wielka, Wiewiórów, Wola Blakowa and Woźniki.

Neighbouring gminas
Gmina Lgota Wielka is bordered by the gminas of Dobryszyce, Kleszczów, Ładzice, Strzelce Wielkie and Sulmierzyce.

References
Polish official population figures 2006

Lgota Wielka
Radomsko County